Yunnan Normal University Business School is an independent university run by Yunnan Normal University with social investment. It was approved by the State Education Commission as an undergraduate university of regular higher education.

By the end of 2006, there were more than 9000 on-campus students. By the end of 2006, this institute had graduated over 400 students.

The library contains 780,000 books (500,000 paper books and 280,000 e-books). The cost of teaching equipment is worth more than 26000,000 yuan all together.

Majors and facility: There are 11 departments and 15 undergraduate majors, including International Trade and Commerce, Business Management, Community Management, Finance, Marketing, E-Commerce, Tourism Management and Service, Computer Science and Technology, Law, Chinese, English, Pre-school Education, Advertising, Music and Dancing. The faculty includes more than 700 full-time and part-time teachers, among which doctors, masters and post-graduates account for 39.2%, professors and associate professors take 36.1%. Moreover, the Academic-Committee and the Teaching Supervising Committee plays an important role in conducting orientation for the school, making and modifying teaching plans, reforming teaching management and employing teachers. The school operates a strict teacher evaluation system that helps to ensure a high quality of teaching.

International program
International Program facing to the South-east Asia: The Business School has agreement with many first-rate universities in Thailand, such as Chiangmai University, Burapha University, and Assumption University, and has started many academic projects such as co-education, teacher-exchange. It has sent over 300 teachers and students abroad for further education, practice and employment while having accepted over 200 international students to study Chinese culture and language.

External links
Yunnan Normal University Business School

Universities and colleges in Kunming
Business schools in China
Educational institutions established in 2000
2000 establishments in China